The 2016 Shoot Out (officially the 2016 Ladbrokes Snooker Shoot Out) was a professional non-ranking  snooker tournament that took place between 12 and 14 February 2016 at the Hexagon Theatre in Reading, England. It was played under a  variation of the standard rules of snooker.

Michael White was the defending champion, but he lost 1–66 against Ben Woollaston in round two.

Robin Hull won the final 1-0 (50–36) against Luca Brecel.

Prize fund
The breakdown of prize money for this year is shown below:
Winner: £32,000
Runner-up: £16,000
Semi-final: £8,000
Quarter-final: £4,000
Last 16: £2,000
Last 32: £1,000
Last 64: £500
Highest break: £2,000
Total: £130,000

Main draw

Top half

Bottom half

Final

Century breaks 

 127  David Gilbert

References

2016
2016 in snooker
2016 in English sport
Sport in Reading, Berkshire
February 2016 sports events in the United Kingdom